Rindgea is a genus of moths in the family Geometridae described by Alexander Douglas Campbell Ferguson in 2008.

Species
The maricopa species group
Rindgea subterminata (Barnes & McDunnough, 1913) Texas
Rindgea nigricomma (Warren, 1904) Louisiana, Texas, New Mexico, Arizona
Rindgea adjacens (Dognin) Mexico
Rindgea heliothidata (Guenée, 1857) Hispania, Venezuela?
Rindgea piccoloi (Rindge, 1976) Baja California, Arizona
Rindgea parcata (Grossbeck, 1908) Arizona, New Mexico, Mexico (Baja California, Sonora)
Rindgea disparcata Ferguson, 2008 Texas
Rindgea stipularia (Barnes & McDunnough, 1913) Texas
Rindgea prolificata Ferguson, 2008 Texas, New Mexico, Arizona, southern California
Rindgea maricopa (Hulst, 1898) California, Arizona, Nevada, Texas, Mexico (Sonora, Baja California)
Rindgea flaviterminata (Barnes & McDunnough, 1913) Texas
The s-signata species group
Rindgea indeterminata (Warren, 1906) Mexico
Rindgea s-signata (Packard, 1873) southern Texas, northern Mexico, New Mexico
Rindgea cyda (Druce, 1893) Louisiana, Missouri, Oklahoma, Arkansas, Kansas, Texas, New Mexico, Arizona, California, Mexico
Rindgea ballandrata (Wright, 1923) Arizona, Mexico (Baja California, Sonora)
Rindgea hypaethrata (Grote, 1881) Arizona, New Mexico, Texas, northern Mexico, Baja California

References

Geometridae
Geometridae genera